The flow coefficient of a device is a relative measure of its efficiency at allowing fluid flow. It describes the relationship between the pressure drop across an orifice valve or other assembly and the corresponding flow rate.

Mathematically the flow coefficient  (or flow-capacity rating of valve) can be expressed as :

where:
  is the rate of flow (expressed in US gallons per minute),
 SG is the specific gravity of the fluid (for water = 1),
  is the pressure drop across the valve (expressed in psi).

The use of the flow coefficient offers a standard method of comparing valve capacities and sizing valves for specific applications that is widely accepted by industry. The general definition of the flow coefficient can be expanded into equations modeling the flow of liquids, gases and steam using the discharge coefficient.

Absolute pressures (psia) must be used for gas rather than simply differential pressure.

For air flow at room temperature, when the outlet pressure is less than 1/2 the absolute inlet pressure, the flow becomes quite simple (although it reaches sonic velocity internally). With  = 1.0 and 200 psia inlet pressure the flow is 100 standard cubic feet per minute (scfm).  The flow is proportional to the absolute inlet pressure, so the flow in scfm would equal the  flow coefficient if the inlet pressure were reduced to 2 psia and the outlet were connected to a vacuum with less than 1 psi absolute pressure (1.0 scfm when  = 1.0, 2 psia input).

Flow factor 
The metric equivalent flow factor is calculated using metric units :

where

  is the flow factor (expressed in m3·h−1).
  is the flowrate (expressed in cubic metres per hour m3·h−1),
 SG is the specific gravity of the fluid (for water = 1),
  is the differential pressure across the device (expressed in bar).

 can be calculated from  using the equation:

References

See also
 Discharge coefficient

Fluid dynamics